The International Shrine of Our Lady of Peace and Good Voyage informally known as 
the Cathedral of Antipolo is a Roman Catholic cathedral in Antipolo, Philippines. It enshrines a venerated Black Madonna image of the Blessed Virgin Mary as Our Lady of Peace and Good Voyage, and serves as the seat of the Bishop of Antipolo. 

The shrine attracts millions of pilgrims annually, especially during the pilgrimage season which commences with the believers walking from the Quiapo Church on April 30 to May.

History 
The first missionaries of Antipolo were the Franciscans. The first church in Antipolo was built by the Society of Jesus under Rev. Juan de Salazar. The Jesuits administered the church from 1591 to 1768. The church was prepared for the image of Nuestra Señora dela Paz y Buen Viaje in 1632. However, the church structure was greatly damaged during the 2nd Sangley Rebellion (1639) and the earthquakes of 1645, 1824 and 1863. The church, meant to house the image of Our Lady of Peace and Good Voyage brought by then-Governor General Juan Niño de Tabora, was supposed to be built on a different plot of land. The church's present location was the site of the tipolo (Artocarpus blancoi), top which the image was found after mysteriously vanishing several times.

The church was completed in 1632, but suffered severe damage in 1639 when the Sangley (Chinese) set fire to the church in a revolt. It was restored afterwards though it was damaged by the 1645 Luzon earthquake, and other earthquakes in 1824 and 1863. Nevertheless, the church became a popular pilgrimage site as many devotees paid reverence to Our Lady of Peace and Good Voyage, including Philippine national hero and polymath José Rizal, who visited the shrine as a boy with his father, Francisco Mercado, on 6 June 1868. The pair went on pilgrimage to fulfill a vow Rizal's mother, Teodora Alonso, had made when she and the boy survived his delivery.

Towards the end of World War II in 1945, the church was destroyed by Allied bombardment meant to liberate the area from the Japanese imperial control. After the war, a campaign was organized to build a new church, with the fundraising committee headed by former First Lady Aurora Quezon and Antipolo parish priest, Francisco Avendano. Architect José L. de Ocampo was commissioned to design the new shrine. The construction began in 1948 and completed in 1954.

On 14 January 1954, the Catholic Bishops Conference of the Philippines declared the new Antipolo Church as declared the National Shrine to Our Lady of Peace and Good Voyage. The church was elevated to the status of cathedral on 25 June 1983, upon the canonical erection of the Diocese of Antipolo.

On June 18, 2022, the Holy See declared the Antipolo Cathedral as an international shrine, making it the 11th international shrine in the world and the third in Asia after the St. Thomas Church Malayattoor in India, and the Haemi Martyrdom Holy Ground together with the Seoul Pilgrimage Routes in South Korea. It is also the first Marian international shrine in Asia.

Pilgrimage Season 
The Pilgrimage Season of the cathedral is initiated yearly by the "Pagdalaw ng Ina sa Anak" (Mother's Visit to her Son), which is the temporary transfer of Our Lady of Peace and Good Voyage from Antipolo Cathedral to Quiapo Church, where the Black Nazarene is enshrined. A welcome Mass is held in Quiapo Church at 9:00 in the morning. At 6:00 p.m., the farewell Mass is celebrated, after which the Penitential Walk from Quiapo Church to Antipolo Cathedral commences, with a distance close to 33 kilometers. On the first of May each year, the return of the image of Our Lady of Peace and Good Voyage at the cathedral is celebrated by a Mass at 5:00 in the morning. Every first Tuesday of May, a procession of the image starts at 7:00 a.m. from the cathedral to Pinagmisahan Hill where, at the end, a Mass is celebrated. It was here on May 3, the Feast of the Holy Cross, that a wooden cross was blessed and erected. Since 1947, a commemorative thanksgiving Mass is celebrated on the very first Tuesday of May, inaugurating the start of the Pilgrimage Season which ends on the first Tuesday of July.

Gallery

Sources 
The Official Website of the Roman Catholic Diocese of Antipolo

References 

Buildings and structures in Antipolo
Shrines to the Virgin Mary
Roman Catholic churches in Rizal
Roman Catholic cathedrals in the Philippines
Roman Catholic national shrines in the Philippines
Churches in the Roman Catholic Diocese of Antipolo